Witaszyce  is a village in the administrative district of Gmina Jarocin, within Jarocin County, Greater Poland Voivodeship, in west-central Poland.

The village has a population of 4,300.

References

Villages in Jarocin County